The  was a Japanese guild for blind men, established in the 14th century by the biwa hōshi .  Members performed a variety of roles, as itinerant musicians, masseurs, and acupuncturists.  It received the patronage of the Muromachi and Edo shogunates, and remained active until the Meiji restoration, being eventually disbanded in 1871.

The organization was hierarchically structured. Total membership was usually around 3,000; it is not known what proportion of the total blind population this represents.

See also
 Zatoichi, a famous fictional Tōdōza masseur.
 Za (guilds), the Japanese guild system known as the za (座)

Arts in Japan
Masseurs
Blindness organizations